Chris Overton is an English actor and filmmaker, best known for his film, The Silent Child for which he received critical acclaim and won the Academy Award for Best Live Action Short Film. Overton is the husband of Rachel Shenton, who wrote and starred in The Silent Child.

Filmography

Actor

Producer

Director

Awards and nominations
 Winner: Academy Award for Best Live Action Short Film
 Winner: Best Live ACtion Short - Rhode Island International Film Festival 
 Winner: People's Choice Award and Youth Award - Aesthetica Short Film Festival  
 Winner: Best Narrative Short Film - Savannah SCAD Film Festival
 Winner: Audience Choice Awards - Encounters International Film Festival
 Winner: Best Short Film - Sydney Indie Film Festival
 Winner: Film For Change - Bolton International Film Festival 
 Nominated: Best Director - New Renaissance Island International Film Festival
 Winner: Humanity Award - New Renaissance Island International Film Festival
 Winner: Best Short First - Time Filmmaker Showcase
 Winner: Best Film of the Year - Gold Movie Awards
 Winner: Best Short Film - Overcome Festival

References

External links
 

1989 births
Living people
British actors
British directors
British producers
Directors of Live Action Short Film Academy Award winners
People from Cannock